The FIL European Luge Championships 1928 took place in Schreiberhau, Germany (now Szklarska Poręba, Poland) under the auspices of the Internationaler Schlittensportsverband (ISSV - International Sled Sports Federation in ), a forerunner to the International Luge Federation.

Men's singles

Kauchska earned his second men's singles medal, fourteen years after earning his first.

Women's singles

Men's doubles

Medal table

References
Men's doubles European champions
Men's singles European champions
Women's singles European champions

FIL European Luge Championships
1928 in luge
Luge in Germany
1928 in German sport